Semir Telalovic (born 23 December 1999) is a German professional footballer who plays as a striker for Borussia Mönchengladbach.

Career
Telalovic is a youth product of TSG Ehingen, SSV Ulm, FV Olympia Laupheim and Ehingen-Sud. He began his senior career in the German sixth division, the Verbandsliga, with Ehingen-Süd. Scoring 6 goals in 12 games in a season shortened by the COVID-19 pandemic, he moved to the Regionalliga side Illertissen for the 2021-22 season. After a prolific half season with Illertissen where he scored 14 goals in 23 games, he moved to the Borussia Mönchengladbach U23 side on 19 January 2022. In the 2022-23 season in the Regionalliga, Telalovic had another strong start with 10 goals and 6 assists in 20 games, earning a promotion to the senior Borussia Mönchengladbach side on January 2023. He made his professional debut with Borussia Mönchengladbach as a late substitute in a 1–0 Bundesliga loss to Augsburg on 25 January 2023.

Personal life
Born in Germany, Telalovic is of Bosnian descent. Outside of football, he completed training as an electronics technician for automation technology.

Playing style
Telalovic started playing football as a winger as a youth, before switching to striker after a late growth spurt. He is a versatile attacker that likes drop back to pick up balls, dribble and make plays. His height and strength also help him act as a traditional striker, making him a versatile attacker.

References

External links
 
 
 FuPa profile

1999 births
Living people
People from Ehingen
German footballers
German people of Bosnia and Herzegovina descent
Borussia Mönchengladbach players
Borussia Mönchengladbach II players
FV Illertissen players
Bundesliga players
Regionalliga players
Association football forwards